The 2016 New York City Marathon was the 46th running of the annual marathon race in New York City, United States, which took place on November 6. The elite men's race was won by Eritrea's Ghirmay Ghebreslassie in a time of 2:07:51 hours while Kenya's Mary Jepkosgei Keitany won the women's race in 2:24:26 for a third consecutive victory.

In the wheelchair races, Switzerland's Marcel Hug (1:35:49) and American Tatyana McFadden (1:47:43) won the men's and women's races, respectively. The handcycle races were won by Australia's Michael Taylor (1:23:06) and New Zealand's Tiffiney Perry (2:03:58).

A total of 48,468 runners finished the race, comprising 29,830 men and 18,638 women.

Results

Men's race

Women's race

† Ran in mass race

Wheelchair men

Wheelchair women

Handcycle men

Handcycle women

References 

Results
TCS New York City Marathon 2016. New York Road Runners. Retrieved 2020-05-06.
Men's results. Association of Road Racing Statisticians. Retrieved 2020-04-11.
Women's results. Association of Road Racing Statisticians. Retrieved 2020-04-11.

External links
New York Road Runners website

2016
New York City Marathon
Marathon
New York City Marathon